

UN French Language Day is observed annually on 20 March. 
The event was established by UN's Department of Public Information in 2010 "to celebrate multilingualism and cultural diversity as well as to promote equal use of all six official languages throughout the Organization".

For the French language, 20 March was chosen as the date since it "coincides with the 40th anniversary of the International Organization of La Francophonie",  
a group whose members share a common tongue, as well as the humanist values promoted by the French language.
Other dates were selected for the celebration of the UN's other five official languages.

See also 
 International Mother Language Day
 International observance
 Official languages of the United Nations

References

External links 
 UN French Language Day – Official Site (French)

March observances
French
Francophonie